Liukin, feminine form Liukina is a Russian family name. 

 Nastia Liukin, the 2008 Olympic Women's All-Around Champion representing the United States
 Valeri Liukin, father of Nastia Liukin and a two-time Olympic gold medalist and 1988 Olympic Men's All-Around silver medalist for the Soviet Union
 Anna Kotchneva, mother of Nastia Liukin and a former Soviet rhythmic gymnast

Russian-language surnames